MasterChef Algeria, is an Algerian television reality show of culinary reality Broadcast since November 5, 2016 on Echorouk TV.

Brand identity

1st season (2016)

Top 15

Elimination table

  The concursant wins
  The concursant is in 2nd place
  Wins the grupal challenge
  Lose the grupal challenge
  Wins the individual challenge
  High performance
  Medium performance
  Bad performance
  Immunity
  Last saved
  Eliminated
  Don't compete
  Returns

External links
 Official website

See also

Junior MasterChef
 MasterChef: The Professionals

References

Algeria
Algerian television series
2010s Algerian television series
2016 Algerian television series debuts
Non-British television series based on British television series
2010s cooking television series
Echorouk TV original programming